Drayton Manor Resort is a family theme park, zoo and accommodation in the grounds of the former Drayton Manor, in Drayton Bassett, Staffordshire, England, UK. The park is also home to Thomas Land and Drayton Manor Zoo, home to over 500 animals, including Red pandas, Eurasian lynx, Sumatran tigers and a variety of monkeys and gibbons.

On 3 August 2020, Drayton Manor Park was sold to Looping Group, who own two other attractions in the UK, West Midland Safari Park and Pleasurewood Hills.

History 
The land on which the theme park was built on once belonged to the Peel family.  Drayton Manor mansion, built for Sir Robert Peel, 2nd Baronet in 1835, had been reduced to ruins by 1926, with only the clocktower surviving at the park entrance. The British Army requisitioned it as a training post during World War II. After the war, entrepreneurs George and Vera Bryan borrowed £6,000 and bought the land (and the 17 huts that the army had constructed during their stay). In 1950, they opened a small amusement park with just a handful of children's rides. In 1954, Mrs. Molly Badham, who later opened the nearby Twycross Zoo, partnered with the Bryans and opened a zoo to complement the amusement park. The amusement park grew slowly in the 1950s, '60s and '70s, but, in the late '80s, the park began to install bigger and more thrilling rides to attract customers from all over the United Kingdom and to compete with rival theme parks. In 1992 Colin Bryan, George Bryan's son, became managing director of the park.

George Bryan is the grandson of the founders of Drayton Manor Park. Along with his brother and cousins, he grew up in the family business, working – albeit unofficially – from the age of 12 or 13. This career began with menial tasks, before progressing to more complex aspects of operations. George Bryan went on to develop expertise throughout the whole business. In 2013 George's brother, William Bryan, became managing director while George moved out of operations to work at board level; the park in 2020 has been taken over by a corporate group, called The Looping Group.

In February 2020, the park suffered flood damage from Storm Dennis. Following this, the park was required to remain shut until July 2020 due to the COVID-19 pandemic.

On 3 August 2020, the park entered administration and was bought by the Looping Group who own various parks, zoos and aquariums around Europe such as Pleasurewood Hills and West Midlands Safari Park. However the Bryan family still play a key part in running the business, with William Bryan's role being managing director, even though under new ownership.

In December 2020, the park suffered a fire within the Thomas Land area of the park.  The blaze started in a toilet block and was deemed accidental by investigators.

At the end of 2021 the park announced that something big was coming with the teaser Invading 2022 in a Nordic Viking style, hinting at the fact there was to be a new area in 2022 called Vikings. After soft opening on 17 May the intricately-themed area officially opened on 28 May, featuring three new rides and the rethemed Buffalo roller coaster.

In May 2022 the park announced an entire rebrand and a new logo, renaming from 'Drayton Manor Theme Park' to 'Drayton Manor Resort'.

Rides and attractions 
Drayton Manor is split into various themed areas, composing of rides and attractions.

Adventure Cove

Vikings

Main Park

Thomas Land

Other attractions

Past rides and attractions

Zoo
Drayton Manor is also home to a  zoo. It contains over 100 species from all over the world.

Events 
Drayton Manor offer a range of 'family friendly events' throughout the season.

Halloween at Drayton

Pumpkin Smash Bash 
Open from 10:30am - 5pm daily, this event is tailored towards the park's younger visitors. The signature attraction is 'The Castle of Spooks' which offers a 15-minute experience where guests get to meet Halloween characters and take part in spooky activities including scary stories, interactive games, and trick or treating. The park's signature area Thomas Land is dressed with creepy decorations, pumpkins and spooky entertainment.

Night at the Manor 
Advertised as the 'Ultimate Scare Experience', this event runs on selected dates throughout October, from 5pm-9pm. Aimed at the park's older visitors, on top of the scare attractions, guests get to experience night rides on the Haunting and rides in the new Vikings themed area - which also features the park's resident DJ. 

 – Previous Night at the Manor attraction.  – Current Night at the Manor attraction.

Accommodation

Drayton Manor Hotel 
In 2009, plans for a hotel at Drayton Manor were submitted to Lichfield District Council. Planning permission for the hotel was granted in 2007, though the applicants felt that the scheme could benefit from further improvements without increasing the site area required.

The 4-star hotel with 150 well-appointed contemporary guest rooms including 15 Thomas & Friends themed bedrooms is designed to primarily meet the demand from park visitors as the park is attracting families from all over the UK, especially since the arrival of Thomas Land.

Camping and Caravanning Club 
The Camping and Caravanning Club have a site at Drayton Manor. On the site there are 90 pitches, glamping tents (available through Ready Camp) and a children's playground.

References

External links
 Official website

Amusement parks in England
Zoos in England
Tourist attractions in Staffordshire
Companies that have entered administration in the United Kingdom
1950 establishments in England